Central Maluku Regency is a regency of Maluku Province of Indonesia. The Regency covers an area of 11,595.57 km2, and had a population of 361,698 at the 2010 Census, and 423,094 at the 2020 Census. The official estimate as at mid 2021 was 424,730. The principal town lies at Masohi, on Seram Island.  The regency (kebupaten) is composed of the central part of the island of Seram, the Banda Islands, and the Lease Islands (Saparua, Haruku, and Nusa Laut), together with those parts of Ambon Island which are outside the City of Ambon.

This regency is the largest in area among Malukan regencies.

Geography 
Central Maluku as one of the regencies in Maluku Province, is located in the central part of Seram Island between West Seram Regency in the west and East Seram Regency in the east, both of which were separated from Central Maluku on 18 December 2003, but it also includes a number of islands to the south, chiefly Ambon Island, the Lease Islands and the Banda Islands. The total area of Central Maluku Regency is approx 275,907 km2 which consists of a sea area of 264,311.43 km2 and a land area of 11,595.57 km2.

Climate 
The Central Maluku region experiences a tropical marine climate and a monsoon climate. This is because Central Maluku is surrounded by vast seas, so that the tropical marine climate in this area is in rhythm with the existing seasonal climate. The following climatological conditions can describe the climatic conditions in Central Maluku Regency in general: The average temperature recorded in 2009 in Amahai District was 26.30C, where the maximum average temperature was 30.40C and the minimum average was 23.30C. The average amount of rainfall in 2009 was 185.1 mm with an average number of rainy days of 18.1 days. The average sun irradiation in 2009 was 65.9% with an average air pressure of 1,011.2 millibars and an average relative humidity of 84.9%.

Administration 
The regency is divided into eighteen districts (kecamatan), tabulated below with their areas (in km2) and their populations at the 2010 Census and the 2020 Census, together with the official estimates as at mid 2021. The table also includes the number of administrative villages in each district (a total of 186 rural desa and 6 urban kelurahan) and its post code.

Notes: (a) 2010 population figure for Saparua Timur is included in that for Saparua.
(b) comprises the five kelurahan (with 2020 Census populations) of Ampera (6,385), Lesane (4,493), Letwaru (6,412), Namaelo (15,280) and Namasina (3,863).(c) 2010 population figures for Seram Utara Timur Kobi and Seram Utara Timur Seti are included in that for Seram Utara.(d) 2010 population figure for Telutih is included in that for Tehoru.

Villages
 

Yaputih

References

External links